Samuel Gardner Waller (1881-1955) was a United States Army brigadier general and the Adjutant General of Virginia. He was responsible for overseeing the Virginia Army National Guard and the Virginia Air National Guard. He was born March 26, 1881 to Nelson and Rebecca Waller of Front Royal, Virginia. He married Ms. Anna Louise Ford, also of Front Royal, in 1903. He died December 2, 1955 at the age of 74 and was buried at the Prospect Hill Cemetery in Front Royal, Virginia.

Education 
Waller attended Front Royal High School, Randolph-Macon Academy 1892-1894 and the Locust Dale Academy 1895-1897 before graduating from the University of Virginia with a law degree in 1902. While at the University of Virginia he played baseball.

Military career 
After graduation from the University of Virginia, Waller joined Company D, 2nd Virginia Volunteer Infantry as a sergeant in April 1903. Soon after, he was commissioned as a second lieutenant in Company D, 2nd Virginia Regiment, also known as the Warren Light Infantry. He also served as aide-de-camp on the staff of General C. C. Vaughn, commander of 1st Virginia Brigade, where he was later selected to and served as the commander of Company D, 2nd Virginia Regiment, during operations against Pancho Villa on the U.S.-Mexico border in 1916. He spent 1917 on Federal service and was responsible for guarding bridges, trestles and tunnels in Southwest Virginia. During World War 1 he was promoted to the rank of major and commanded the 2nd Regiment, 116th Infantry, 29th Division, which he led in combat during the Meuse Argonne Offensive. In 1919, Waller returned home after earning the rank of lieutenant colonel.

On September 9, 1921, Waller was promoted to the rank of brigadier general and placed in command of the 91st Infantry Brigade (redesignated 88th Infantry Brigade). Following the retirement of Maj. Gen. William W. Sale, Waller was appointed as the Adjutant General of Virginia on July 1, 1931 by Governor John Garland Pollard and subsequently reappointed by Governors James Hubert Price, Colgate Darden, William M. Tuck, John S. Battle and Thomas B. Stanley. In 1948, Waller was promoted to Major General (Va.). On December 2, 1955, Waller passed away.

Legal and political career 
Following graduation from the University of Virginia Law School in 1903, Waller established his own law practice in Front Royal. In 1906, Waller was elected as the mayor of Front Royal and was reelected in 1908, 1910 and 1912. As an attorney, Waller served as the U.S. referee in bankruptcy for the western district of Virginia in 1919 and in 1919 he served as a U.S. Commissioner. In 1924, Waller was elected to the Virginia House of Delegates as the representative of Page and Warren Counties. He continued to serve as delegate until 1927.

Legacy 
S. Gardner Waller Depot, a Virginia Army National Guard armory in Richmond, Virginia, is named in honor of Waller.

Awards and decorations 
 Haute-Alsace Medal
 Meuse-Argonne Verdun Medal
 Commander, Crown of Italy
 Commander, Order of King Haakon of Norway
 Virginia National Guard Distinguished Service Medal
 National Guard Association of the United States' Distinguished Service Medal

References 

United States Army personnel of World War I
University of Virginia School of Law alumni
Virginia Cavaliers baseball players
Military personnel from Virginia
Members of the Virginia House of Delegates
Virginia lawyers
20th-century American politicians
20th-century American lawyers
1881 births
1955 deaths
Mayors of places in Virginia
People from Front Royal, Virginia